"All Mixed Up" is a song by the Cars and the final track on their 1978 self-titled debut album. It was written by bandleader Ric Ocasek.

Background
On the album, "All Mixed Up" is bridged together with "Moving in Stereo". Released as the B-side to the single "Good Times Roll", the song has received widespread airplay on American FM rock radio stations, and is generally played together with "Moving in Stereo" on AOR and classic rock radio stations. The song also saw single release in the Netherlands, backed with "You're All I've Got Tonight" (also from The Cars.)

"All Mixed Up" features bassist Benjamin Orr on lead vocals in the studio version, though Ocasek sang lead vocals on the demo version. The song afforded Hawkes a chance to step away from his many synthesizers and play the closing saxophone solo, the only one in the Cars' discography. "All Mixed Up" also featured the Mu-Tron Octavider pedal, which Benjamin Orr recalled he "had to have."

Other versions
When Cars guitarist Elliot Easton and keyboardist Greg Hawkes recruited new musicians to replace Ocasek, the deceased Orr, and drummer David Robinson, they chose Todd Rundgren as primary singer, but "All Mixed Up" and the hit ballad "Drive" were sung by bassist/vocalist Kasim Sulton.
This song was later covered by the Red House Painters on their 1996 album, Songs for a Blue Guitar.

References

The Cars songs
1978 singles
Songs written by Ric Ocasek
Song recordings produced by Roy Thomas Baker
1978 songs
Elektra Records singles